The 1966 Asian Judo Championships were held in Manila, Philippines.

Medal overview

Men's events

Medals table

References
Judo Channel by Token Corporation

External links
Judo Union of Asia

Asian Judo Championships
Asian Championships
Asian Judo Championships
International sports competitions hosted by the Philippines
20th century in Manila
Judo competitions in the Philippines